The 1970 North Dakota Fighting Sioux football team, also known as the Nodaks, was an American football team that represented the University of North Dakota in the North Central Conference (NCC) during the 1970 NCAA College Division football season. In its third year under head coach Jerry Olson, the team compiled a 5–3–1 record (5–1–1 against NCC opponents), finished in second place out of seven teams in the NCC, and outscored opponents by a total of 202 to 138. 

Linebacker Don McLean received second-team honors on the 1970 Little All-America college football team.

The team played its home games at Memorial Stadium in Grand Forks, North Dakota.

Schedule

References

North Dakota
North Dakota Fighting Hawks football seasons
North Dakota Fighting Sioux football